Abdoulaye Koffi (born 30 December 1991) is an Ivorian footballer who plays for Al-Hudood SC in the Iraqi Premier League.

Personal life
Abdoulaye's elder brother, Mohamed Koffi is a former Burkinabé international footballer who plies his trade for Smouha SC in the Egyptian Premier League.

Club career

Egypt
Abdoulaye began his professional career in Egypt in 2008 with Hurghada-based Grand Hotel FC. In his two-year spell at the Hurghada-based club, he scored 26 goals in 44 appearances. At the end of the 2010–11 season, he received the "Top Scorer" award of the 2010–11 Egyptian Second Division League for his outstanding performance in the season and for scoring 16 league goals in 24 matches. In 2011, he moved to another Egyptian Second Division club, Eastern Company. In his three-year spell at the club, he scored 17 goals in 35 appearances.

Saham
Saham SC

In August 2014, he moved to Oman and on 27 August 2014 he signed a one-year contract with Saham SC of Oman Professional League. He made his Oman Professional League debut on 19 November 2014 in a 1-0 loss against Bowsher Club and scored his first goal on 27 September 2014 in a 2-0 win over Al-Seeb Club. He also made his Sultan Qaboos Cup debut and scored his first goal on 1 December 2014 in a 3-0 win over Masirah SC in the Round of 32 of the competition. He also made his Oman Professional League Cup debut on 13 November 2014 in a 3-1 win over Al-Nahda Club and scored his first and only goal of the competition on 5 January 2014 in a 3-2 win over fierce rivals, Al-Khabourah SC. He scored 2 goals in 5 appearances in the 2014–15 Oman Professional League and 1 goal in 6 appearances in the 2014–15 Oman Professional League Cup for the Saham-based club.

Al-Suwaiq

Al-Suwaiq Club

On January 6, 2015, he signed a six-month contract with another Oman Professional League club, Al-Suwaiq Club. He made his club debut and scored his first goal on 3 January 2014 in a 2-2 draw against Saudi Arabia's Al-Taawon FC in the 2015 GCC Champions League. He scored 12 goals in 15 appearances in the 2014–15 Oman Professional League for the Al-Suwaiq-based club which included a hat-trick on 15 April 2015 in a 4-1 win over Al-Seeb Club. He also scored 2 goals in 3 appearances in the 2015 GCC Champions League.

In August 2015, he signed a one-year contract extension with the Al-Suwaiq-based club. In the 2015-16 season, he made his first appearance and scored a brace on 5 September 2015 in a 3-1 win over Al-Shabab Club in the 2015-16 Oman Professional League Cup. He made his first appearance in the 2015-16 Oman Professional League on 13 September 2015 in a 2-1 win over Al-Nasr S.C.S.C. and scored his first goal in the competition on 18 October 2015 in a 3-1 win over Al-Shabab Club. Moreover, the other two goals in the game for the Al-Suwaiq-based club also came from the Ivorian thus making him the first hat-trick scorer of the 2015–16 Oman Professional League.

Al-Khaleej
After his eye catching performance in Oman Professional League, he caught the eye of various clubs in the region and as a result moved to Saudi Arabia on 22 January 2016 where he moved on loan to Saudi Professional League side, Al-Khaleej on loan from Omani outfit, Al-Suwaiq Club. He made his Saudi Professional League debut on 29 January 2016 in a 0-0 draw against Al-Fateh SC at the Prince Abdullah bin Jalawi Stadium and scored his first goal on 10 February 2016 in a 1-2 loss against Saudi giants, Al-Shabab FC.

Shillong Lajong
After various successful stints in the Middle East, the Ivorian finally made the decision to ply his trade in a new market and moved to India in September 2017. He signed a one-year contract with I-League side, Shillong Lajong FC.

Club career statistics

Honours

Individual
2010–11 Egyptian Second Division: Top Scorer
2014–15 Oman Professional League: Second Top Scorer

References

External links
Abdoulaye Koffi - KOOORA
Abdoulaye Koffi My goal is to help Al-Khaleej achieve their goal in Saudi League - khaleejclub.sa
Abdoulaye Koffi - YouTube
Abdoulaye Koffi - YouTube
Abdoulaye Koffi - YouTube
Abdoulaye Koffi - YouTube
Abdoulaye Koffi (Press Conference - Al-Khaleej) - YouTube

1991 births
Living people
Footballers from Abidjan
Ivorian footballers
Ivorian expatriate footballers
Association football forwards
Eastern Company SC players
Saham SC players
Suwaiq Club players
Khaleej FC players
Oman Professional League players
Saudi Professional League players
Expatriate footballers in Egypt
Ivorian expatriate sportspeople in Egypt
Expatriate footballers in Oman
Ivorian expatriate sportspeople in Oman
Expatriate footballers in Saudi Arabia
Ivorian expatriate sportspeople in Saudi Arabia
Expatriate footballers in India
Ivorian expatriate sportspeople in India
Expatriate footballers in Burkina Faso
Ivorian expatriate sportspeople in Burkina Faso
Expatriate footballers in Iraq
Ivorian expatriate sportspeople in Iraq